Hörnefors station (Swedish: Hörnefors station or Hörnefors resecentrum) is a railway station in Hörnefors, Sweden. The station opened in 2010 as part of the new Bothnia Line from Sundsvall to Umeå.

References 

Bothnia Line
Railway stations in Umeå
Railway stations opened in 2010